Berryville is a city in Carroll County, Arkansas, United States. The population was 5,682 at the 2020 census. making it the largest city in Carroll County. Along with Eureka Springs, it is one of the two county seats of Carroll County.

History

Berryville was founded by local settler Blackburn Henderson Berry in 1850; his nephew James Henderson Berry would become the fourteenth governor of Arkansas in 1883. The city was incorporated in 1876.

Geography
U.S. Route 62 passes through the center of the city, leading east  to Harrison and west  to Rogers. Arkansas Highway 21 leads north from Berryville  to the Missouri line.

Demographics

2020 census

As of the 2020 United States census, there were 5,682 people, 2,009 households, and 1,269 families residing in the city.

2010 census
As of the census of 2010, there were 5,356 people, 1,963 households, and 1,309 families residing in the city. The racial makeup of the city was 81.7% White, 0.5% Black or African American, 0.8% Native American, 0.9% Asian, 0.4% Native Hawaiian or Pacific Islander, 13.2% some other race, and 2.6% two or more races. 24.7% of the population were Hispanic or Latino of any race.

There were 1,963 households, out of which 38.9% had children under the age of 18 living with them, 45.3% were headed by married couples living together, 14.9% had a female householder with no husband present, and 33.3% were non-families. 28.5% of all households were made up of individuals, and 13.3% were someone living alone who was 65 years of age or older. The average household size was 2.65, and the average family size was 3.26.

In the city, the population was spread out, with 29.0% under the age of 18, 9.8% from 18 to 24, 25.5% from 25 to 44, 21.1% from 45 to 64, and 14.6% who were 65 years of age or older. The median age was 33.5 years. For every 100 females, there were 90.3 males. For every 100 females age 18 and over, there were 86.0 males.

For the period 2008–2012, the estimated median annual income for a household in the city was $30,046, and the median income for a family was $37,717. Male full-time workers had a median income of $28,244 versus $24,074 for females. The per capita income for the city was $16,924. About 14.2% of families and 17.4% of the population were below the poverty line, including 17.5% of those under age 18 and 14.8% of those age 65 or over.

Education 
Public education for elementary and secondary school students is provided by the Berryville School District, which leads to graduation at Berryville High School.

Places of interest

Saunders' Museum, which has guns used by outlaws such as Pancho Villa, Billy the Kid, and many others, as well as other items of interest, is located in the center of town.

Berryville is the home of handgun manufacturing companies of Nighthawk Custom and Wilson Combat, as well as the International Defensive Pistol Association, a body that sanctions practical shooting competitions that emphasize real-world self-defense scenarios.

Little Portion Hermitage, a community founded by Christian musician John Michael Talbot, is located outside of Berryville.

Transportation
 US Highway 62
 US Highway 62 Spur
 Arkansas Highway 21
 Arkansas Highway 143
 Arkansas Highway 221
 Arkansas Highway 980

Notable people
Bob Ballinger, Republican member of the Arkansas House of Representatives from District 97 (Carroll, Madison, and Washington counties); resides and maintains law office in Berryville
James Henderson Berry, U.S. senator, 14th governor of Arkansas
James William Trimble, former congressman, unseated in 1966 by Republican John Paul Hammerschmidt, a former Berryville lawyer

References

External links
 City of Berryville official website 

 
Cities in Carroll County, Arkansas
Cities in Arkansas
County seats in Arkansas
Populated places established in 1850
1850 establishments in Arkansas